Walter Selke (born 1947) is a German retired professor for Theoretical Physics at the RWTH Aachen.

After having received his doctoral degree at the Leibniz University Hannover, followed by postdoctoral positions at the Saarland University, Cornell University, and Boston University, he became in 1981 a permanent scientific staff member of Forschungszentrum Jülich. He held a similar position at the IBM Research Center (Zürich) in 1985/1986. Since 1996 he is a university professor at the RWTH Aachen, and he is also, since 2008, engaged in the "Jülich Aachen Research Alliance" (JARA). In 2012, he retired from his teaching duties. 

His main field of expertise is Statistical Physics, with applications, especially, to magnetism and surface physics. 
He is best known for his work on
commensurate and incommensurate spatially modulated superstructures in solids, with realizations in magnets, ferroelectrics, alloys and adsorbate systems.

He has published about 150 scientific papers in journals, conference proceedings, monographs and books, including many review articles. Among his coauthors are Kurt Binder, Michael E. Fisher, and Valery Pokrovsky. He has (co)organized several workshops and conferences, for instance, in the years 1988 to 1997, a series of meetings with physicists from the Landau Institute for Theoretical Physics, which took place alternately in Germany and Russia.

From 1997 to 2000 he was member of the editorial board of the Journal of Statistical Physics. In the inaugural year 2008, he was named an 'Outstanding Referee' by the American Physical Society.

In 2009, he held a guest professorship at the University of New South Wales.

Publications

     
 W.Selke, "Spatially Modulated Structures in Systems with Competing Interactions".In Phase Transitions and Critical Phenomena, eds. C.Domb and J.L. Lebowitz, vol. 15, p.1-72 (1992)

External links
Homepage at RWTH Aachen
Outstanding APS referees

1947 births
20th-century German physicists
Living people
21st-century German physicists
Academic staff of RWTH Aachen University